"Downtime" is a song written by Phillip Coleman and Carolyn Dawn Johnson, and recorded by American country music singer Jo Dee Messina.  It was released in April 2001 as the third single from her album Burn.  The song peaked at number 5 on the Hot Country Singles & Tracks (now Hot Country Songs) chart and peaked at number 46 on the U.S. Billboard Hot 100 making it a minor crossover hit.

Chart performance
"Downtime" debuted at number 50 on the U.S. Billboard Hot Country Singles & Tracks for the week of April 14, 2001.

Year-end charts

References

2001 singles
2000 songs
Jo Dee Messina songs
Songs written by Carolyn Dawn Johnson
Song recordings produced by Byron Gallimore
Song recordings produced by Tim McGraw
Curb Records singles